Doliopsidae is a family of tunicates belonging to the order Doliolida.

Genera:
 Doliolula Robison, Raskoff & Sherlock, 2005
 Doliopsis Vogt, 1854

References

Tunicates